Condrieu is a commune in the Rhône department in eastern France.

It has an area of 921 hectares and in 2018 it had a population of 3,927. Its altitude ranges from 146 to 460 metres.

Condrieu produces white wine, Condrieu AOC, and goat milk cheese, the Rigotte de Condrieu.

See also
French wine
Communes of the Rhône department

References

External links

 Official website
 Pilat Oueb, local information on Condrieu
 Gazetteer Entry

Communes of Rhône (department)